Shorne and Ashenbank Woods is a  biological Site of Special Scientific Interest between Rochester and Gravesend in Kent. Part of it is Shorne Wood Country Park.

These woods have diverse and important invertebrates, especially dragonflies, beetles and true bugs, including the rare beetles Mordella holomelaena and Peltodytes caesus. Several clay workings have been landscaped to create shallow ponds designed for wildlife.

There is public access to the site.

References

Sites of Special Scientific Interest in Kent
Forests and woodlands of Kent